The Sinner is a 1951 West German romantic drama film directed by Willi Forst and starring Hildegard Knef, Gustav Fröhlich and Änne Bruck. It was shot at the Bendestorf Studios and on location in Naples, Rome and Positano. The film's sets were designed by the art director Franz Schroedter.

Plot
It is a love story between the prostitute Marina and the unsuccessful artist Alexander, who suffers from a cancer which makes him blind and ill. They are happy for a short period in Italy. Despite Marina's loving care, Alexanders health gets worse and they together commit suicide in the end.

Scandal 
It was one of the first German films to break several taboos: nudity, suicide and euthanasia. In the Germany of the 1950s, this caused a lot of negative reactions both by politicians and the Roman Catholic Church. The opposition reached the degree of banning the film and scandalizing it, which paradoxically made it one of the landmarks in the German film history. Despite or because of the scandal, Die Sünderin proved to be the breakthrough role of Hildegard Knef.

Cast 
 Hildegard Knef as Marina
 Gustav Fröhlich as Alexander
 Änne Bruck as Marina's mother
 Wera Frydtberg as a colleague
 Robert Meyn as Marina's stepfather
 Jochen-Wolfgang Meyn as Marina's stepbrother
 Andreas Wolf as a doctor

Notes and references

External links
 

1951 films
1951 romantic drama films
German romantic drama films
West German films
1950s German-language films
German black-and-white films
Films directed by Willi Forst
Films about prostitution in Germany
Films about euthanasia
Films about suicide
Obscenity controversies in film
1950s German films